What Means Solid, Traveller? is an album by guitarist David Torn, released in 1996.

Track listing 

 "Spell Breaks with the Weather" (5:49)
 "What Means Solid, Traveller?" (6:52)
 "Such Little Mirrors" (7:22)
 "Tiny Burns a Bridge" (8:42)
 "Gidya Hana" (7:27)
 "Each Prince, to His Kingdom, Must Labor to Go" (3:58)
 Particle Bugs @ Purulia Station" (7:42)
 In the Sands of these Days (a) "I Will Not Be Free... (2:59)
 (b) "...Til You Are Free" (4:25) (live)
 "Elsewhere, Now Than Waving" (10:09)

Personnel
David Torn - guitar & guitar-like thingies, textural & rhythmic loops, samples, voices, the pink lark, percussion, Cody's viola, Elijah's bass, mandolina, kotar
Fima Ephron - acoustic bass (tracks 5 & 7), el bass (first half of track 5)

Samples from -
Will Calhoun - drum kit loop (track 1)
Cannonball Adderley - little spoken vocal (track 1)
Gota Yashiki - the groove activator, drumkit loops (tracks 2,3 & 9)
Steve Jansen - drum kit loop (track 5)
David Ruffy - drum kit loop (track 7)
Mitch Mitchell - drum kit fill (track 9)

1996 albums
David Torn albums
Albums produced by David Torn